Next to Nothing may refer to:

 Next to Nothing (Rittz album)
 Next to Nothing (Nicky Skopelitis album)
 "Next to Nothing", song from The Golden Year by Ou Est le Swimming Pool
 "Next to Nothing", a song from  Fatboy Slim's debut album Better Living Through Chemistry